The VG engine family consists of V6 engines designed and produced by Nissan for several vehicles in the Nissan lineup. The VG series was introduced in 1983, becoming Nissan's and Japan's first mass-produced V6 engine. VG engines displace between 2.0 and 3.3 liters and feature an iron block and aluminum heads at a 60° vee-angle. The early VG engines featured a SOHC arrangement with two valves per cylinder. Later versions featured a slightly different block, a DOHC arrangement with four valves per cylinder, and N-VCT, Nissan's own version of variable valve timing, for a smoother idle and more torque at low to medium engine speeds. The production blocks and production head castings were used successfully in the Nissan GTP ZX-Turbo and NPT-90 race cars which won the IMSA GT Championship three years in a row.

Origins
Development of the VG series began in 1979 by Nissan Machinery, a former member of the Nissan Group keiretsu. The objective during development was to replace the Nissan L engine, an engine that can trace its roots back to the Mercedes-Benz M180 engine introduced in 1951, with an all-new V6 engine. The VG engine was fully designed by Nissan from scratch, and shared little mechanical components with its predecessor, or with another automaker's engine. Nissan engineers wanted the VG engine to have improved performance, fuel economy, reliability, and refinement, as well as having reduced weight and a more compact design than its predecessor. Extensive computer design techniques were used during development, which made the VG series one of the most advanced and high-tech engines of its day. It featured a sequential multi-port fuel injection system, and Nissan's Electronic Concentrated Control System (ECCS).

ECCS used a microprocessor and an oxygen sensor to control fuel delivery, spark timing, exhaust gas recirculation rate, and engine idle speed, depending on the current operating conditions of the engine. This system reduced carbon emissions, improved fuel economy, and improved engine performance during cold-start and warm-up conditions.

The advantages of the VG engine over its predecessor was that its V6 configuration would have greater torsional rigidity for higher performance potential, and its shorter length would give Nissan designers and engineers more freedom for vehicle design, allowing them to design vehicles that had more frontal crush zone space, and would allow transverse mounting for front-wheel-drive vehicles.

All VG engines use a timing belt to synchronize the camshafts with the crankshaft, in comparison to the L engine, which uses a timing chain. Most VG engines use an interference design; in the event of a timing belt failure, The pistons will likely bend the valves, and can cause major engine damage. The VG series engine was put into thousands of Nissan vehicles, debuting in Japan in the 1983 Nissan Gloria/Nissan Cedric, and in the US and other markets in the 1984 Nissan 300ZX.

When the Nissan VQ engine was introduced in 1994, the VG engine was slowly phased out in Nissan cars, and after 2000 it was only available in the Nissan Frontier and Nissan Xterra. The VG engine was retired in 2004, by which time all V6-powered Nissans had switched to the VQ engine.

VG20E

The VG20E is a  SOHC engine produced from 1984 on. In the earlier gross rating system, early eighties' models claim .

Applications:
 1983–1987 Nissan Gloria/Nissan Cedric Y30
 1987–1999 Nissan Gloria/Nissan Cedric Wagon/Van Y30
 1986-1988 Nissan Bluebird Maxima U11
 1986-1992 Nissan Leopard F31
 1987–2002 Nissan Gloria/Nissan Cedric Y31
 1991–1995 Nissan Gloria/Nissan Cedric Y32
 1996–2002 Nissan Gloria/Nissan Cedric Y33
 1997-1999 Nissan Leopard JY33
 2000–2005 Hongqi Century Star - based on Hongqi CA7180 and 7202 Audi 100 based

VG20ET

The VG20ET was based on the VG20E, but with an added turbocharger. The VG20ET produces . This SOHC motor debuted at the same time as the VG20E. Also coming with the Y30, this motor was known as the "Jet Turbo", and came with the Nissan Leopard models XS, and XS-II Grand Selection. The turbo included with the VG20ET had two different settings. At low speeds, the turbo's wastegate would stay closed improving the response at low rpm. At high speeds, the flap would stay open, decreasing resistance and increasing exhaust flow. At its maximum flow, the flap would open at an angle of 27 degrees, while the A/R ranged from 0.21–0.77. Being that the VG20ET had a short stroke , it was thought to have insufficient low end torque. Nevertheless, the VG20ET was a great improvement over the VG20E.

Applications:
1984–1989 Nissan 200Z (Z31)
1984–1989 Nissan 200ZG (Z31)
1984–1989 Nissan 200ZS (Z31)
1984–1989 Nissan Laurel Medallist (C32)
1986–1988 Nissan Leopard (F31)
1984–1990 Nissan Bluebird (PU11)

VG20DET

The VG20DET is an DOHC  engine with a ceramic turbocharger and intercooler. This engine features NVTCS (Nissan's Valve Timing Control System).

Applications:
 1987—1999 Nissan Gloria/Nissan Cedric (Y31)
 1988.08—1992.06 Nissan Leopard (F31)

VG20P

The VG20P is the Autogas (Liquified petroleum gas) version of the VG20. It is an overhead cam, twelve-valve engine.

Applications:
1987–2005 Nissan Cedric Y31

VG30S

This engine was mainly offered in export markets with more lenient environmental regulations, such as the Middle East and Africa.

Applications:
 Nissan Cedric Y31
 Nissan Laurel C32

VG30i

The VG30i is a  engine produced from 1986 through 1989. It features a throttle body fuel injection system. It has a long crank snout, a cylinder head temperature sensor positioned behind the timing belt cover, and a knock sensor in the cylinder valley (on California models only).

Applications:
 1986–1989 D21 Hardbody Truck
 1986–1989 Nissan Pathfinder/Nissan Terrano

VG30E

In April 1987 the "W" series VG30 was released, adding 5 horsepower but leaving torque unchanged.

Applications:
 1984–1989 Nissan 300ZX  9.0:1 compression ratio for NA
 1984–1989 Nissan Laurel
 1985–1994 Nissan Maxima 
 1987–1988 Nissan 200SX SE
 1988–1996 Nissan Homy & Caravan series E24
 1990–1992 Infiniti M30/Nissan Leopard
 1990–1995 D21 Hardbody Truck
 1990–1996 Nissan Pathfinder/Nissan Terrano
 1992–1999 Nissan Gloria/Nissan Cedric 
 1993–1998 Nissan Quest/Mercury Villager (modified to become a non-interference design)

VG30ET

Applications:
 1984–1989 Nissan 300ZX Turbo (Z31)
 Nissan Leopard
 Nissan Gloria/Nissan Cedric 
 1985–1990 Nissan GTP ZX-Turbo Racecar (non-production)
 1986 Nissan R86V Racecar (non-production)

VG30DE

The first quad cam 24 valve VG30DE engine was developed for the 1985 MID4 concept. Original Japanese market units claimed . There are two versions of the VG30DE. The first was introduced in 1986 on the Japanese 300ZR (Z31) and Nissan Leopard F31, and were never sold in North America. The VG30DE has two throttle bodies facing the front of the vehicle (Nissan 300ZX and Fairlady Z) or two throttle bodies to the left (sedans and 300ZR). It was also installed with N-VCT, an early form of variable valve timing.

Early VG30DEs used large oval intake ports, and round exhaust ports, though the flange was similar to the SOHC VG engine, bolt spacing was slightly different. Late VG30DE's used slightly smaller oval intake ports, and oval exhaust ports. The bolt spacing was shared with the round-port variant from earlier years.

Applications:

VG30DET

While this engine is similar to the VG30DE, it used different heads and inlet manifold. Contrary to popular belief, it was not available in the Nissan 300ZR model - the 300ZR only had an early version of the VG30DE (non turbo). The engine was available in the Cedric, Gloria, Cima and Leopard chassis. It is a single-turbo engine that was used from 1987 through 1995 in the Japanese market, and the predecessor for the VG30DETT engine.

Applications:
Nissan Cedric Y32 (1991–1994)
Nissan Gloria
Nissan Cima FY31, FY32 (1988–1995)
Nissan Leopard
Autech Zagato Stelvio (based on the F31 Leopard) used a modified version with 280PS @ 6000rpm.

VG30DETT

The VG30DETT was first developed for the 1987 MID4-II concept and produced . Coming in at a weight of 523lb it was the last of Nissan's DOHC belt driven 4 valves per cylinder turbocharged engines put into production, being preceded by the CA18DET and RB20DET. It is equipped with hybrid T22/TB02 twin-turbochargers which were developed exclusively for Nissan, twin intercoolers, and NVTCS (Nissan's Valve Timing Control System). The VG30DETT utilizes an iron block with aluminum heads. JDM cars claimed , as the Japanese automobile manufacturers were limited to that number.

Applications:
 1987 Nissan MID4-II Concept (non-production)
 1989–2000 Nissan 300ZX(USA)/Fairlady Z32(JP) 
1990–1993 Nissan NPT-90/NPT-91 Racecars (non-production)

VG33E

The VG33E is a  version built in Smyrna, TN. It has a cast iron engine block and aluminum SOHC cylinder heads. Compression ratio is 8.9:1. It has sequential fuel injection, two valves per cylinder with self-adjusting hydraulic followers, forged steel connecting rods, one-piece cast camshafts, and a cast aluminum lower intake manifold with either a cast aluminum, or plastic/composite plenum (upper intake manifold).

Applications:
 1996–2000 Nissan Pathfinder
 1996–2004 Nissan Pathfinder In Australian Models
2003–2006 Nissan Navara In Australian Models
 1997–2000 Infiniti QX4
 1999–2004 Nissan Frontier
 2000–2004 Nissan Xterra
 1997–2002 Nissan Elgrand
 1999–2002 Nissan Quest/Mercury Villager
 1999–2004 Nissan Paladin

The VG33E reportedly remained in production in the Nissan Paladin (rebadged as Dongfeng Oting) as an optional engine for the Chinese market until 2015.

VG33ER

The  VG33ER is a supercharged version of the VG33 only sold in North America.

Applications:
 2001–2004 Nissan Frontier SC
 2002–2004 Nissan Xterra SC

See also
List of Nissan engines
Nissan

References

External links
Vee Six Zed: Forget the relatively easy task of dropping a RB-series six into a classic Zed - try the quad-cam VG30DET for a challenge! at AutoSpeed Issue: 368 16 February 2006 by Michael Knowling, Pix by Julian Edgar
The Nissan VG30DETT - Inside its development AutoSpeed Issue: 469. 28 February 2008. By Julian Edgar. 

VG
V6 engines
Gasoline engines by model